Dens invaginatus (DI), also known as tooth within a tooth, is a rare dental malformation where there is an infolding of enamel into dentine. The prevalence of condition is 0.3 - 10%, affecting more males than females. The condition is presented in two forms, coronal and radicular, with the coronal form being more common.

DI is a malformation of teeth most likely resulting from an infolding of the dental papilla during tooth development or invagination of all layers of the enamel organ in dental papillae. Affected teeth show a deep infolding of enamel and dentine starting from the foramen coecum or even the tip of the cusps and which may extend deep into the root. Teeth most affected are maxillary lateral incisors (80%), followed by maxillary canines (20%). Bilateral occurrence is not uncommon (25%).

Signs and symptoms
Tooth affected by this condition has a higher risk of developing caries and periradicular pathology. The thin layer of the infolding enamel could be chipped off easily, providing entrance for microorganisms into the tooth canal. This can cause abscess formation, displacement of dental structures (i.e. teeth). Preventive measures should be taken.

Cause
Cause of DI is unclear. However, there are several theories:
Infection
Trauma
Growth pressure of the dental arches during odontogenesis
Rapid proliferation of the internal enamel epithelium invades the underlying dental papilla

Diagnosis
During clinical examination, abnormally shaped tooth can be observed. Teeth with this condition can have a conical shape or deep pit on the lingual side or have an exaggerated talon cusp.

Although examination may reveal a fissure on the surface of anterior tooth, radiographic examination is the way. On a periapical radiograph, the invagination lesion will appear as a radiolucent pocket. It is usually seen beneath the cingulum or incisal edge. Larger lesions can appear as fissures. A radio-opaque could be shown. Pulp may be involved and the root canal could have complex anatomy. Two periapical radiographs are often required to make sure that it is not a masked lesion.

Cone beam computed tomography (CBCT) is useful in diagnosing DI. It provides clinicians a detailed 3D image and could aid treatment planning. Feasibility of root canal treatment or apical surgery or other procedures could be assessed.

Oehlers' classification

Class I - Partial invagination. It is limited to the crown of tooth. The lesion does not extend pass the cementoenamel junction (CEJ) or the pulp.
Class II - Partial invagination. It extends beyond the crown and CEJ. Pulp may be involved but remain within the root anatomy. There is no communication of the lesion with periodontal ligament (PDL).
Class IIIa - Complete invagination. It extends through root and communicates with PDL. It usually does not involve the pulp but can cause anatomical malformation.
Class IIIb - Complete invagination. It extends through the root and communicates with PDL through apical foramen. Pulpal anatomy may not be directly involved but can cause disruption to the dental anatomy.

Histology
No irregularities in the dentin below invagination
Strains of vital tissue or fine canals that communicates with the pulp could be found
Enamel lining irregularly structured
External and internal enamel have different structures

Management
Preventative treatment - e.g. oral hygiene instructions, fissure sealant
Intentional replantation
Root canal treatment with mineral trioxde aggregate
Periapical surgery with retrograde filling
Extraction

References

External links 

Developmental tooth disorders